Prior to the Supreme Court's decision in Obergefell v. Hodges (2015), U.S. state constitutional amendments banning same-sex unions of several different types passed, banning legal recognition of same-sex unions in U.S. state constitutions, referred to by proponents as "defense of marriage amendments" or "marriage protection amendments." These state amendments are different from the proposed Federal Marriage Amendment, which would ban same-sex marriage in every U.S. state, and Section 2 of the Defense of Marriage Act, more commonly known as DOMA, which allowed the states not to recognize same-sex marriages from other states. The amendments define marriage as a union between one man and one woman and prevent civil unions or same-sex marriages from being legalized, though some of the amendments bar only the latter. The Obergefell decision in June 2015 invalidated these state constitutional amendments insofar as they prevented same-sex couples from marrying, even though the actual text of these amendments remain written into the state constitutions.

Thirty-one U.S. state constitutional amendments banning legal recognition of same-sex unions have been adopted. Of these, ten make only same-sex marriage unconstitutional; sixteen make both same-sex marriage and civil unions unconstitutional; two make same-sex marriage, civil unions, and other contracts unconstitutional; and one is unique. Hawaii's amendment is unique in that it does not make same-sex marriage unconstitutional; rather, it allows the state to limit marriage to opposite-sex couples. Virginia's amendment prevents the state from recognizing private contracts that "approximate" marriage. Observers have pointed out that such language encompasses private contracts and medical directives.  Furthermore, the Michigan Supreme Court has held that the state's amendment bans not only same-sex marriage and civil unions, but also domestic partnership benefits such as health insurance. On November 3, 2020, Nevada became the first U.S. state to repeal its amendment banning same-sex marriage following approval of 2020 Nevada Question 2.

State constitutional amendments are typically approved first by the legislature or special constitutional convention and then by the voters in a referendum. In some states, one or both of these steps is repeated. The percentages shown in the list are results from the referendum stage, not the legislative stage.

History
The idea of extending marriage rights to same-sex couples did not become a political issue in the United States until the 1990s. During that decade, several Western European countries legalized civil unions, and in 1993 the Supreme Court of Hawaii ruled in Baehr v. Lewin, 852 P.2d 44 (Haw. 1993), that refusing to grant marriage licenses to same-sex couples was sex-discrimination under that state's constitution.  In response, voters passed  Hawaii Constitutional Amendment 2.  This amendment differed from future marriage amendments in other states as it did not ban same-sex marriage itself, but merely empowered the state legislature to enact such a ban. In November 1998, 69% of Hawaii voters approved the amendment, and the state legislature exercised its power to ban same-sex marriage.  Only three constitutional bans on same-sex unions (in Alaska, Nebraska, and Nevada) were proposed between 1998 and 2003.
All three amendments passed.  In Massachusetts Supreme Judicial Court's November 2003 decision in Goodridge v. Department of Public Health, the court legalized same-sex marriage in Massachusetts.  Social and religious conservatives feared that their own state supreme courts would issue such rulings at some point in the future; in order to prevent this, they proposed additional constitutional bans on same-sex marriage.  The following year, eleven constitutional referendums banning same-sex unions were placed on state ballots.

Purpose and motivation

Constitutional bans on same-sex unions were advocated in response to the legalization of same-sex marriage in other jurisdictions, notably Canada and Massachusetts.

Some amendments and some proposed amendments forbade a state from recognizing even non-marital civil unions and domestic partnerships, while others explicitly allowed for same-sex unions that were not called "marriages".

Such amendments had two main purposes:
 Preventing a state's courts interpreting their state's constitution to permit or require legalization of same-sex marriage.
 Preventing a state's courts recognizing same-sex marriages that were legally performed in other jurisdictions.

Some proponents of such amendments feared that states would be forced to recognize same-sex marriages celebrated in other jurisdictions.  They pointed to the full faith and credit clause, which requires each state to recognize the public acts, records, and judicial proceedings of each other state.  On the other hand, opponents argued that state constitutional amendments would do nothing to resolve this perceived problem. Traditionally, courts have held that a state is free to decline to recognize a marriage celebrated elsewhere if the marriage violates the state's strong public policy. (§134 of the First Restatement of Conflicts, on Marriage and Legitimacy (1934)). That tradition was broken in 1967 with the Loving v. Virginia case decided by a unanimous Supreme Court, which confirmed that the full faith and credit clause did require recognition of all legal marriages. Similarly, in Obergefell v. Hodges the Supreme Court ruled that the federal constitution required state recognition of same-sex marriages. All state constitutions are trumped by the federal constitution due to the supremacy clause.

Conservative mobilization
State referendums on constitutional bans of same-sex unions have at times been accused of having been used as a "get-out-the-vote" tactic by some Republicans and social conservatives. When voters see that a particular legislative initiative appears on the ballot, they are thought to feel more motivated to turn out to vote, enhancing ballot numbers for other candidates and issues of their party. The presence of these amendments on state ballots has been credited by some as supposedly providing a boost to Republicans in the 2004 election, and the 2004 Ohio amendment in particular has been cited as aiding President George W. Bush's reelection campaign by motivating evangelical social conservatives in the state to go to the polls. President George W. Bush's close political consultant, Karl Rove, has been an enthusiastic proponent and organizer of legislation banning same-sex unions.

After the 2006 elections some activists argued that such referendums were starting to lose their potential to mobilize conservative voters. Kevin Cathcart, director of Lambda Legal pointed to the narrow defeat of Arizona's Proposition 107, which would have rendered civil unions as well as same-sex marriage unconstitutional.  Nevertheless, that same election saw seven such amendments pass; these seven included an amendment in Virginia which banned civil unions as well as same-sex marriages.

Variants
Most U.S. state constitutional amendments banning same-sex unions banned civil unions as well as same-sex marriage.

Two marriage amendments differed greatly from all others: Hawaii's and Virginia's. The former gave the Hawaii state legislature the authority to ban same-sex marriages but did not explicitly make such unions unconstitutional. Virginia's amendment not only banned same-sex marriage and civil unions, but arguably rendered any state recognition of private contracts entered into by unmarried couples unconstitutional.

Approved amendments

Amendments that grant legislative authority to ban same-sex marriage

Amendments that ban same-sex marriage

Amendments that ban same-sex marriage and civil unions, but not other contracts

Amendments that ban same-sex marriage, civil unions, and other contracts

Repealed amendments

Failed amendments
 Arizona Proposition 107 – On November 7, 2006, Arizona rejected a constitutional amendment banning same-sex marriage and civil unions by 51.8% of the vote. Two years later Arizona voters approved a more narrow amendment banning only same-sex marriage.
 Minnesota Amendment 1 – On November 6, 2012, Minnesota rejected a constitutional amendment banning gay marriage with 51.90% of the electorate opposed. A majority of all votes cast would be required to amend the state constitution.

Obergefell v. Hodges

On June 26, 2015 the U.S. Supreme Court ruled in Obergefell that state laws banning same-sex marriage violate the Fourteenth Amendment, rendering such laws unconstitutional and invalidating the remaining 14 same-sex marriage bans still being fully or partially enforced.

As of 2016, bills have been introduced in Virginia and other states to legislatively repeal the null-and-void amendments.

See also
Same-sex marriage law in the United States by state

Notes

References